The 1980–81 Marquette Warriors men's basketball team represented Marquette University during the 1980–81 men's college basketball season. The Warriors finished the regular season with a record of 19–11.

Roster

Schedule

Team players drafted into the NBA

External links
MUScoop's MUWiki

References 

Marquette
Marquette Golden Eagles men's basketball seasons
Marquette
Marquette
Marquette